Lagocheirus plantaris is a species of longhorn beetle of the subfamily Lamiinae. It was described by Wilhelm Ferdinand Erichson in 1847, and is known from northern South America, eastern Ecuador, Bolivia, Colombia, Costa Rica, and Panama.

Subspecies
 Lagocheirus plantaris plantaris Erichson, 1847
 Lagocheirus plantaris gorgonae Dillon, 1957 - Named for Gorgona, Colombia, from which it was described.
 Lagocheirus plantaris indistinctus Dillon, 1957

References

Beetles described in 1847
Lagocheirus